Västra Trädgårdsgatan is a street at Norrmalm in Stockholm, Sweden. The street stretches from Kungsträdgården to Hamngatan and to Jakobsgatan. 

The Matchstick Palace is located on Västra Trädgårdsgatan.

References

Streets in Stockholm